Abacetus iricolor is a species of ground beetle in the subfamily Pterostichinae. It was described by Andrewes in 1936.

References

iricolor
Beetles described in 1936